The 13401 / 02 Bhagalpur - Danapur Intercity Express is an Express train belonging to Indian Railways Eastern Railway zone that runs between  and  in India.

Coaches
The 13401 / 02 Bhagalpur - Danapur Intercity Express has one AC chair car, 14 general unreserved & two SLR (seating with luggage rake) coaches . It does not carry a pantry car coach.

As is customary with most train services in India, coach composition may be amended at the discretion of Indian Railways depending on demand.

Service

Routing

Traction
As the route is going to electrification, a  based WDM-3A diesel locomotive pulls the train to its destination.

References

External links
13401 Intercity Express at India Rail Info
13402 Intercity Express at India Rail Info

Intercity Express (Indian Railways) trains
Rail transport in Bihar
Transport in Patna
Transport in Bhagalpur